Kálmán Szury (4 February 1889 – 12 April 1915) was a Hungarian footballer. He competed in the men's tournament at the 1912 Summer Olympics.

References

External links
 

1889 births
1915 deaths
Hungarian footballers
Hungary international footballers
Olympic footballers of Hungary
Footballers at the 1912 Summer Olympics
Footballers from Budapest
Association football midfielders
Budapesti AK players